Hope Lost is an Italian English-language sex trafficking thriller directed by David Petrucci. The film stars Danny Trejo, Mischa Barton, Michael Madsen and Daniel Baldwin. The film chronicles the struggles of a young Romanian woman trafficked to Italy. Filming took place in Rome in 2014 and the film premiered at the Los Angeles Italia Film Festival on 20 February 2015.

Plot summary
A young Romanian woman from a small town meets a man claiming to be a film director and he convinces her to come to Rome for auditions. This is a ruse and she is instead lured into a life of prostitution in Italy and then sold by her pimp to a man who intends to torture her and another young woman in a snuff movie.

Cast
Danny Trejo as Marius
Mischa Barton as Alina
Michael Madsen as Manol
Daniel Baldwin as Ettore
Francesca Agostini as Sofia
Andrey Chernyshov as Gabriel

References

External links
 

Italian crime thriller films
English-language Italian films
2015 horror thriller films
Works about sex trafficking
Films about human trafficking
Films set in Rome
Films shot in Rome
2015 horror films
2010s English-language films
2010s Italian films